Enrique Heredia (1 January 1912 – 26 June 1996) was a Mexican cyclist. He competed in the sprint event at the 1932 Summer Olympics.

References

External links
 

1912 births
1996 deaths
Mexican male cyclists
Olympic cyclists of Mexico
Cyclists at the 1932 Summer Olympics
Sportspeople from Mexico City